Peking Duk are an electronic music group made up of disc jockeys and music producers Adam Hyde and Reuben Styles. The pair first garnered attention in 2012 with the release of a Passion Pit bootleg remix. Their biggest hit "High" reached 5 on the ARIA Singles Chart, achieved a triple platinum certification and won the ARIA Award for Best Dance Release at the ARIA Music Awards of 2014.. Notable festivals Peking Duk have performed include Falls Festival, Spilt Milk, Splendour in the Grass and Big Day Out.

History 
Peking Duk was formed in 2010 in Canberra, Australia, by Adam Hyde and Reuben Styles. The pair had started off in their local city of Canberra. Styles had been the bass guitarist for local indie rock group, Rubycon, from 2007 to 2010. Upon the release of their Passion Pit bootleg remix in May 2012, the pair gained attention from music blogs. Since then they have released two singles.

In 2013, Peking Duk placed 4th in the Australia wide InTheMix Top 50 competition. This was their second year in a row in the top 10 of the competition (6th in 2012). 2013 also saw Peking Duk receive strong support from national youth broadcaster Triple J. Along with having their tracks added to rotation, Triple J also gave Peking Duk the opportunity to be a Triple J Mix Up resident which saw them present and host a weekly DJ Mix on Saturday nights for a month.

In February 2014, they had their first Top 40 hit on the ARIA Singles Chart with their track "High" featuring Australian vocalist Nicole Millar. In August 2014, Peking Duk signed a worldwide record deal with Sony Music Entertainment in conjunction with RCA Records. In July 2015, Peking Duk released a new single called "Say My Name" ft. Benjamin Joseph. Peking Duk released an international EP titled Songs to Sweat To.

In December 2015, at a show in Melbourne, a fan named David Spargo accessed the backstage area by editing the band's Wikipedia article page and inserting himself as a family member. Upon showing the article and his ID to the security guards, he was granted access to the band with whom he shared a beer. The band reacted positively to this scheme, stating: "He explained to us his amazing tactic to get past security to hang with us and we immediately cracked him a beer. This dude is the definition of a legend." However, Hyde did add: "It goes to show, never trust Wikipedia".

In March 2019, the pair embarked on their biggest national tour to date bringing along Kwame and Kira Puru as supports. In April 2020, Australian radio station Triple J premiered a new song by the duo in collaboration with Ben O'Connor called "Stay The F*ck Home", as part of a COVID-19 self-isolation musical challenge nicknamed Quarantune.

Discography

Extended plays

Singles

Other appearances

Remixes
 Liz - "U Over Them" (Peking Duk & CRNKN Remix) [Mad Decent]
 Dem Slackers - "Sclingel" (Peking Duk Remix) [Tuffemup!]
 Rob Pix - "Beng" (Peking Duk Remix) [Downright]
Steve Aoki & Angger Dimas featuring Iggy Azalea – "Beat Down" (Peking Duk Remix) [Dim Mak]
DCUP - "I'm Corrupt" (Peking Duk Remix) [Chookie]
Fitz and the Tantrums - "Out of My League" (Peking Duk Remix) [WMG]

Bootlegs
Passion Pit - "Take A Walk" (Peking Duk Remix)
Ben Howard - "Old Pine" (Peking Duk Remix)

Awards and nominations

AIR Awards 
The Australian Independent Record Awards (commonly known informally as AIR Awards) is an annual awards night to recognise, promote and celebrate the success of Australia's Independent Music sector.

ARIA Music Awards 
The ARIA Music Awards is an annual awards ceremony that recognises excellence, innovation, and achievement across all genres of Australian music.

APRA Awards 
Since 1982 the APRA Awards are run by Australian Performing Right Association to recognise songwriting skills, sales and airplay performance by its members annually.

MTV Europe Music Awards
The MTV Europe Music Awards is an award presented by Viacom International Media Networks to honour artists and music in pop culture.

|-
| 2015
| themselves
| Best Australian Act
| 
|-
| 2018
| themselves
| Best Australian Act
| 
|-

National Live Music Awards
The National Live Music Awards (NLMAs) are a broad recognition of Australia's diverse live industry, celebrating the success of the Australian live scene. The awards commenced in 2016.

|-
|  National Live Music Awards of 2017
| Peking Duk
| Live Electronic Act (or DJ) of the Year
| 
|-
|  National Live Music Awards of 2018
| Peking Duk
| International Live Achievement (Band)
| 
|-
| National Live Music Awards of 2020
| Peking Duk
| Musicians Making a Difference
| 
|-

Notes

References

External links
 
 
 

2010 establishments in Australia
APRA Award winners
ARIA Award winners
Australian Capital Territory musical groups
Australian electronic musicians
Australian house musicians
Australian house music groups
Sony Music Australia artists